Daishen Nix (born February 13, 2002) is an American professional basketball player for the Houston Rockets of the National Basketball Association (NBA). He was a consensus five-star recruit and one of the best point guards in the 2020 class. A former UCLA signee, Nix bypassed playing college basketball and joined the NBA G League Ignite. At the high school level, he competed for Trinity International School in Las Vegas, Nevada.

Early life and high school career
Nix was born in Fairbanks, Alaska and raised in Anchorage, Alaska. He played basketball for Mears Middle School in Anchorage. After eighth grade, at age 13, Nix moved to Las Vegas, Nevada, upon his mother's advice, to gain more basketball exposure and to live closer to his extended family.

In high school, Nix played for Trinity International School in Las Vegas. As a junior, Nix averaged 19.9 points, 6.2 rebounds and 5.1 assists per game, leading his team to its second straight National Christian School Athletic Association (NCSAA) Division I title. He finished his junior season as NCSAA Player of the Year and as his team's all-time leader in points, rebounds and assists. On October 15, 2019, as a senior, Nix registered a triple-double of 45 points, 11 assists and 10 steals in a win over PHH Prep. In March 2020, he shared Grind Session most valuable player honors with Jalen Green. Nix was selected to play in the McDonald's All-American Game, which was canceled due to the COVID-19 pandemic. In addition to his high school basketball, Nix competed for independent team  Simply Fundamental, which was owned and operated by his high school coach and legal guardian, Greg Lockridge.

Recruiting
On August 20, 2019, Nix committed to playing college basketball for UCLA over offers from Alabama, Kansas, Kentucky and Maryland. On November 13, 2019, he signed a National Letter of Intent with the Bruins. On April 28, 2020, Nix decommitted from UCLA and announced that he would forgo his college eligibility to join the NBA G League Ignite.

Professional career

NBA G League Ignite (2021)
On April 28, 2020, Nix signed a one-year, $300,000 contract with the NBA G League Ignite, a developmental team affiliated with the NBA G League. He explained his decision by saying, "I think it was the right thing for me because it was a family thing and a myself thing. Playing in G League is basically getting me ready for the NBA draft. It's just one step below the NBA." Nix averaged 8.8 points, 5.3 rebounds and 5.3 assists per game.

Houston Rockets (2021–present)
After going undrafted in the 2021 NBA draft, Nix joined the Philadelphia 76ers for the 2021 NBA Summer League. On August 25, 2021, he signed with the Houston Rockets and on October 16, they turned his deal into a two-way contract. Under the terms of the deal, he split time between the Rockets and their NBA G League affiliate, the Rio Grande Valley Vipers.

On February 15, 2022, the Rockets converted Nix's contract into a standard deal.

Career statistics

NBA

|-
| style="text-align:left;"| 
| style="text-align:left;"| Houston
| 24 || 0 || 10.9 || .403 || .269 || .533 || 1.4 || 1.7 || .6 || .0 || 3.2
|- class="sortbottom"
| style="text-align:center;" colspan="2"| Career
| 24 || 0 || 10.9 || .403 || .269 || .533 || 1.4 || 1.7 || .6 || .0 || 3.2

Personal life 
Nix's mother, Mina Tupuola, played basketball for Lathrop High School in Fairbanks, Alaska and attended the University of Alaska Fairbanks.

References

External links
NBA G League profile
USA Basketball bio

2002 births
Living people
American men's basketball players
Basketball players from Alaska
Houston Rockets players
McDonald's High School All-Americans
NBA G League Ignite players
Point guards
Rio Grande Valley Vipers players
Sportspeople from Anchorage, Alaska
Sportspeople from Fairbanks, Alaska
Undrafted National Basketball Association players